

List 
Note: The Lions number is an indication and subject to change, certain match sheets are currently incomplete due to missing records primarily from Match #21 (Switzerland 1995) and Match #13 (Denmark 1992). Currently for the sake of this list below the Lions number can only be assigned alphabetically on the match sheet prior to the match to those making their selection debut whether someone took the field or not.

See also
 Luxembourg national rugby union team
 Luxembourg Rugby Federation
 Rugby union in Luxembourg
 Luxembourg women's national rugby union team
 Luxembourg national rugby sevens team
 List of international rugby union families

Clubs
 Rugby Club Luxembourg
 Rugby Club Walferdange

References

External links 
Rugby Europe - Current Season Fixtures, Results and Table
Luxembourg rugby union stats from ESPN -  scrum.com

Rugby union in Luxembourg
Luxembourg